Chappaquiddick Island (Massachusett language: tchepi-aquidenet; colloquially known as "Chappy"), a part of the town of Edgartown, Massachusetts, is a small island off the eastern end of Martha's Vineyard. Norton Point, a narrow barrier beach, sometimes connects Martha's Vineyard and Chappaquiddick between Katama and Wasque (pronounced way-sqwee). Breaches occur due to hurricanes and strong storms separating the islands for periods of time, most recently on December 22, 2022. While both land forms have mostly been connected to one another in modern history, Chappaquiddick is nevertheless referred to as an island.

Visitors come to the isolated island for beaches, cycling, hiking, nature tours and birding, and the MyToi Gardens, a small Japanese garden created amidst the native brush. Two fire trucks are stationed on the island from Edgartown. Chappaquiddick Road and Poucha Road, both paved, provide access to sandy, woodland roads, trails, and shorelines.

Chappaquiddick became internationally known following an incident of the same name in 1969, when U.S. Senator Ted Kennedy accidentally drove his car off the island's Dike Bridge into Poucha Pond. Kennedy's 28-year-old passenger, Mary Jo Kopechne, drowned inside the car.

Name and early settlement
The name Chappaquiddick comes from a Native American word "cheppiaquidne" meaning "separated island", so named because this island is separated from Martha's Vineyard by a narrow strait or gut. The island has been historically spelled  "Chaubaqueduck" or, alternatively, "Chappaquidgick".

The island was once mainly the home territory of the Chappaquiddick band of Wampanoag Indians, and remained exclusively theirs well into the nineteenth century.

Early colonists settled Edgartown in 1642, and quickly proclaimed Chappaquiddick as village property. The first homes owned by people of exclusively European descent were built around 1750; these residents raised livestock and farmed the land.

Geography

Wasque is a popular fishing spot for catching bluefish, striped bass, and other species. The Cape Poge Lighthouse, first erected in 1801, has served ships navigating the shoalwaters and shallows of Muskeget Channel.

Chappaquiddick is mainly defined by its diverse land and water ecologies with expansive salt marshes, ponds, red cedar woods, grassy meadows, and coastal wildlife including sandpipers, piping plovers, blue heron, osprey, and oysters. The main interior bodies of water include Cape Poge Bay, Katama Bay, and Poucha Pond, all salty.

While the island has continually faced shifting coastlines due to ocean currents, storm surges, and astronomical tides, the 21st century has presented new erosion challenges, particularly to Wasque Point which, during the Patriots' Day Storm of 2007, was battered severely.

The United States Census Bureau defines it as Block Group 1, Census Tract 2003 of Dukes County, Massachusetts. It has 15.915 km² (6.145 sq mi) of land. Administratively, it is part of the town of Edgartown and Dukes County.

The Occasional Island

Population
As of the census of 2010, there were 179 people residing on the island. The racial makeup was 93.3% White, 1.7% African American, 0.6% Native American, 0.6% Asian, and 1.7% from two or more races. Hispanic or Latino of any race were 2.2% of the population.

Socially, its residents form a tight-knit community and see themselves as distinctly separate from the rest of Edgartown. Longtime residents speak of "going to the mainland" when they travel to Edgartown and of "going to America" when (for example) they travel to Boston or Cape Cod.

Access to the island is served by privately owned barge-like ferries named the On Time II and On Time III which shuttle pedestrians, bicycles, and up to three cars at a time between Chappaquiddick and Edgartown, on Martha's Vineyard. Two ferries run during the summer months and one during the off-season. Oversand access is possible with four-wheel drive vehicles on the south shore when the islands are connected and conditions permit.

Ted Kennedy incident

Chappaquiddick Island gained international attention on July 19, 1969, when the body of Mary Jo Kopechne was discovered inside an overturned Oldsmobile 88 off Dike Bridge in Poucha Pond. The car belonged to U.S. Senator Ted Kennedy, who claimed that he had taken a wrong turn and accidentally driven it off a bridge late the previous night. He did not report the accident to the police for ten hours. A January 1970 judicial inquest into Kopechne's death found that Kennedy's turn toward the bridge was intentional, and he operated his car in a manner "at least negligent and possibly reckless". A grand jury investigation was held in April 1970; no indictments were issued. Dike Bridge was closed until 1995. In 2017, a film based on the incident was released with many scenes filmed on Chappaquiddick itself and in Edgartown.

See also
Cape Poge Light
Edgartown Yacht Club

References

External links
Martha's Vineyard Vacation Tips
Chappy Ferry website
Chappaquiddick Wampanoag
Mytoi Gardens
Wasque Reservation

 
Islands of Dukes County, Massachusetts
Tourist attractions in Edgartown, Massachusetts
Coastal islands of Massachusetts
Wampanoag